CHPA may stand for:

CHPA-FM
Combined Heat and Power Association
Consumer Healthcare Products Association
Corporate Housing Providers Association